Doris Green may refer to:

 Doris M. Green (1904–1999), British philatelist
 Doris Roberts (born Doris May Green 1925–2016), American character actress